The Gotlands Fotbollförbund (Gotland Football Association) is one of the 24 district organisations of the Swedish Football Association. It administers lower tier football on the island of Gotland.

Background 

Gotlands Fotbollförbund, commonly referred to as Gotlands FF, is the governing body for football in the county of Gotland. The Association was founded on 27 February 1921 and currently has 32 member clubs.  Based in Visby, the Association's Chairman is Hans Rosengren.

Gotland is a member of the International Island Games Association and the Gotland football team has taken part in Football at the Island Games.

Affiliated Members 

The following clubs are affiliated to the Gotlands FF:

Barlingbo IF
Dalhem IF
Eskelhems GoIF
Fardhem IF
Fårösunds GOIK
FC Copa
FC Gute
Garda IK
Gothems GoIF
Gotlands Bro SK
Hangvar SK
Hemse BK
IF Hansa-Hoburg
IFK Visby
IK Graip
Kappelshamns IK
Klintehamns IK
Lärbro IF
Levide IF
När IF
P18 DFF
P18 IK
Roma IF
Rone GoIK
Stenkyrka IF
Vänge IK
Väskinde AIS
Visby AIK
Visby AIK TFF
VSB FF
Wall IF
Wisby Innerstad FK

League Competitions 

Gotlands FF run the following League Competitions:

Men's Football
Division 4  -  one section
Division 5  -  one section
Division 6  -  one section

Women's Football
Division 4 -  one section

Footnotes

External links 
 Gotlands FF Official Website 

Gotlands
Football in Gotland County
Sports organizations established in 1921
1921 establishments in Sweden